Ambré Perkins, known mononymously as Ambré, (born August 29, 1996)  is an American singer and songwriter. She is currently signed to Roc Nation. She has released three full-length projects with Wanderlust (2015), 2090's (2016), and   3000°  (2022). Her debut major label EP, Pulp, was released in November 2019, by Roc Nation. She first gained recognition after collaborating with Kehlani on a cover of Drake's "Preach" in 2015. She also co-wrote two tracks ("Changes" and "U") which featured on H.E.R.'s 2017 self-titled album, which was nominated for multiple Grammy Awards.

Early life
Ambré Perkins was born and raised in New Orleans, Louisiana. At age 4, she entered into the foster care system and went in and out of multiple homes and schools as a child. As a teenager, she joined a church choir and also performed at various talent competitions. At age 17 in 2014, she met producer Erick Bardales and began making music with him.

Career

In April 2015, Ambré released her first full-length mixtape, Wanderlust, which was produced by Erick Bardales. The following month, she collaborated with Kehlani on a cover of Drake's "Preach". This led to her opening for Kehlani on her "You Should Be Here" tour in the summer of 2015. She also appeared at Kehlani's "Tsunami Christmas" concert in December 2015.

In April 2016, she released her second mixtape, 2090's, which featured 15 tracks. In October of that year, she released a collaborative single with Kehlani called "No Service in the Hills". Ambré again appeared alongside Kehlani at the latter's "Tsunami Christmas" event in December 2016. In March 2017, Ambré performed at the BUKU Music + Art Project in New Orleans. In August 2017, she released the single, "Must Be The Fall". The following month, she was featured alongside Isaiah Rashad and Joey Purp on the TOKiMONSTA track, "No Way". Also that year, two tracks she co-wrote ("Changes" and "U") appeared on H.E.R.'s self-titled album, which would go on to win the Grammy Award for Best R&B Album in 2019.

In February 2018, Ambré was featured on the Keys N Krates track, "Glitter". In September of that year, she was featured on the Ryan Hemsworth song, "The Butterfly Effect". She also starred in the song's accompanying music video. In March 2019, Ambré signed a contract with Universal Music Publishing Group through her management firm, Title 9. In September 2019, she released the single, "fubu", which appears on her 2019 EP, Pulp. That month, she also began touring with Lucky Daye on his "Painted" tour. In November 2019, it was announced that Ambré had been signed to Roc Nation. The label also released her 10-track EP, Pulp, at the time of the announcement.

Ambre's third EP 3000° was released on June 17, 2022, and featured guest appearances from Jay Electronica, BEAM, Destin Conrad and Jvck James.

Discography

EPs

Mixtapes

Singles

Guest appearances

References

External links
Ambré on SoundCloud

Singers from Louisiana
Musicians from New Orleans
Songwriters from Louisiana
American hip hop singers
American contemporary R&B singers
Living people
Year of birth missing (living people)